"Her Big Chance" is a dramatic monologue written by Alan Bennett as part of his Talking Heads series for the BBC. The series became very popular, moving onto BBC Radio and international theatre, as well as becoming one of the best-selling audio book releases of all time and being included as part of both the A-level and GCSE English syllabus. It was the fifth episode of the first series of Talking Heads, and originally aired on 17 May 1988.

In the 2020 remake, the character of Lesley was played by Jodie Comer.

Storyline 
Lesley (portrayed by Julie Walters in the original 1988 broadcast and Jodie Comer in the 2020 remake) is an aspiring actress who, after a series of unpromising bit parts on television, is offered what she believes to be her breakout role in a new film for the West German market. However, Lesley does not realise that the film is a soft pornographic film.

Reception

See also 
 English A-level and GCSEs

References

External links
Episode details

BBC television dramas
British plays
BBC Radio 7 (rebranded) programmes